Alexander Campbell DesBrisay (1888–1963) was a Canadian lawyer and judge. He was Chief Justice of British Columbia from 1958 to 1963.

References 

1888 births
1963 deaths
University of Manitoba alumni
Queen's University at Kingston alumni
Lawyers in British Columbia
Judges in British Columbia